Yavuzkemal is a belde (town) in Dereli district of Giresun Province, Turkey. The population of Yavuzkemal is 1669  as of 2011. The settlement was founded by a Turkmen tribe named Kırık in the 14th century and the former name of the settlement was Nahiye'i Kırık (subdistrict of Kırık). According to official records of the Ottoman Empire the population of the settlement decreased in 1485 probably because some of the population was transferred to the newly conquered Trabzon (Trabzon Empire). The settlement was declared a seat of township in 1998.

References

Populated places in Giresun Province
Towns in Turkey
Dereli District